Keuler is a surname. Notable people with the surname include:

 Carsten Keuler (born 1971), German footballer
 Mike Keuler (born 1978), American ski jumper

References